Yong Nyuk Lin (24 June 1918 – 29 June 2012) was a Singaporean politician who served as Minister for Communications between 1968 and 1975, Minister for Health between 1963 and 1968, and Minister for Education between 1959 and 1963. A member of the governing People's Action Party (PAP), he was the Member of Parliament (MP) representing Geylang West SMC between 1959 and 1979. Yong also served as Singapore's High Commissioner to the United Kingdom between 1975 and 1977.

Early life and career
Yong was born in Seremban, Negri Sembilan, Malaysia on 24 June 1918 and studied in Singapore. 

He was the general manager of Overseas Assurance Company for 18 years before he resigned to stand for the 1959 general election in Singapore.

References

External links
Speeches by Yong Nyuk Lin

|-

1918 births
2012 deaths
People from Meixian District
Singaporean people of Hakka descent
Members of the Parliament of Singapore
People's Action Party politicians
Singaporean politicians of Chinese descent
Members of the Dewan Rakyat
Members of the Legislative Assembly of Singapore
Ministers for Health of Singapore
Ministers for Education of Singapore
Communications ministers of Singapore